The Basketball Africa League (BAL) is Africa's premier men's basketball league. The league consists of twelve teams, each qualified through their domestic competition, similar to the format of the UEFA Champions League. The league is a joint effort between the National Basketball Association (NBA) and International Basketball Federation (FIBA).

Its inaugural season started with the qualifying rounds in October 2019 and the regular season in May 2021. The BAL replaced the Africa Basketball League as the continent's top-tier league. The champions of each season becomes eligible to play in the FIBA Intercontinental Cup.

The inaugural season was postponed on 3 March 2020 due to the COVID-19 pandemic. On 29 March 2021, it was announced that the inaugural season would start on 16 May 2021, and would end on May 30th.

History 

On 16 February 2019 the National Basketball Association and FIBA announced plans to establish a continental professional basketball league. During a press conference at the 2019 NBA All-Star weekend, NBA commissioner Adam Silver elaborated on plans to establish the league. He stated that the league will feature 12 teams after qualification tournaments in late 2019. The countries that could possibly host a team include; Angola, Egypt, Kenya, Morocco, Nigeria, Rwanda, Senegal, South Africa and Tunisia. Silver also hinted at the involvement of former U.S. president Barack Obama in an unspecified role. In May 2019, Amadou Gallo Fall was assigned by the NBA as the first president of the BAL. In September 2019, BAL announced the venues and cities for the inaugural season, which included a Final Four played in Kigali Arena in Kigali, Rwanda.

On 15 October 2019, the qualifying tournaments for the inaugural season began, with teams from 32 African countries participating. On 3 March 2020, the BAL announced that it was postponing its season due to the COVID-19 pandemic. A new date would not be settled until 29 March 2021, when the inaugural season was announced to start on 16 May 2021, in the Kigali Arena in Kigali, Rwanda. The season was held in a bubble with limited people in the stands. On 30 May 2021, Zamalek from Egypt won the first-ever BAL championship after beating US Monastir in the inaugural Finals.

Format
Each BAL season consists of twelve teams. In the regular season, the twelve teams are divided into two conferences (Sahara Conference and Nile Conference), in which they play five games each. The four highest-placed teams of each conference advance to the playoffs, which is a single-elimination tournament which decides the BAL champion.

Qualification 

Like Europe's Basketball Champions League and association football's CAF Champions League, the BAL has qualifying rounds to determine which teams play in each season. National federations from African countries are given the opportunity to send one representing club, usually the champions of the respective national league. In the Road to BAL, teams play each other in groups for six remaining spots in the BAL regular season. In the first round, all participating teams are divided over groups, with the top teams advancing to the Elite 16. There, another group stage follows before single-game eliminations are played in the semi-finals and finals.

Six teams from six predetermined countries qualify directly for the regular season, without playing qualifiers, to make for a total of twelve teams. These countries have been determined based on basketball history and commercial market size, and have thus far been Angola, Egypt, Tunisia, Morocco (in 2021), Nigeria, Rwanda (since 2022) and Senegal.

Foreign players restrictions
Each club participating in the BAL regular season is restricted to having four foreign players only, which means it has to have at least 8 local players on its roster. Furthermore, two out of four foreign players must be from an other African country. A maximum of 2 out of the 4 foreign players can be from outside of Africa.

BAL Elevate program
Ahead of the 2022 season, the BAL launched the BAL Elevate program in cooperation with the NBA Academy Africa. The program places a player from the academy in one of the team's rosters. Players from the same country as a BAL team are automatically assigned to a team, while remaining players are selected from a pool. Elevate players do not share in the prize money that is awarded from the competition, to preserve their amateur status.

Teams
Thus far, 19 teams from 16 countries have played in the BAL.

Current teams 
The following table contains the 12 teams for the 2023 BAL season:

Results

List of finals

Performance by club

Performance by country

Records and statistics

Solo Diabate has won the BAL two times, which is the record for most championships by any player. Terrell Stoglin is the all-time top scorer of the league, having scored 308 points in two seasons (as of after the 2022 season).

Thus far, in line with the FIBA Africa Club Champions Cup, teams from Angola, Egypt and Tunisia have been dominant in the competition, qualifying for the semi-finals in both seasons and taking all championships.

All-time participants

The following is a list of clubs who have played in the Basketball Africa League at any time since its formation in 2020 to the current season. A total of 19 teams from 16 countries have played in the BAL thus far.

Sponsorship and partnerships
Since its inception, the BAL has been sponsored by multiple multinational organisations, including:
Air Jordan
Flutterwave
French Development Agency (AFD)
Hennessy
New Fortress Energy
Nike
RwandAir
Wilson

Trophy and prize money 
The champions of the BAL finals receive the competitions' trophy, which is inspired by the adansonia (more commonly known as baobab), a common type of tree in Africa.

In the inaugural season in 2021, the champions reportedly received $100,000 in prize money; runners-up received $75,000; third place $55,000 and fourth place $25,000.

Organisation, ownership and investments 

The BAL is owned and operated by NBA Africa, a sub-entity of the NBA which was established in May 2021. Since then, the league has been driven by private investments. At the moment of establishment, strategic investors including a consortium of Babatunde “Tunde” Folawiyo, Helios Fairfax Partners Corporation (HFP). Other investors included former players such as Dikembe Mutombo, Junior Bridgeman, Luol Deng, Grant Hill, Joakim Noah and Ian Mahinmi. Two months later, it was announced that former President of the United States Barack Obama joined NBA Africa as a strategic partner while also purchasing a minority stake in the organisation. NBA commmissioner Adam Silver stated that NBA Africa was valued at $1 billion.

The organisation of the league currently exists out of:

 Amadou Gallo Fall (Commissioner)
 John Manyo-Plange (Vice-President)
 Victor Williams (CEO NBA Africa)

Media coverage

The BAL games are broadcastin as many as 215 countries in 14 languages. All BAL games are broadcast by:

References

External links
 

 
Basketball in Africa
Men's basketball
2019 establishments in Africa
Sports leagues established in 2019
Basketball in Angola
Basketball in Egypt
Basketball in Kenya
Basketball in Morocco
Basketball in Nigeria
Basketball in Rwanda
Basketball in Senegal
Basketball in South Africa
Basketball in Tunisia
Multi-national professional sports leagues